Zahedi or Zahidi may refer to:

Fazlollah Zahedi (1897–1963), Iranian general and prime minister
Ardeshir Zahedi, Iranian foreign minister and ambassador
Nasser Zahedi, German physician and artist from Iran
Caveh Zahedi, American film director
Mahbub Jamal Zahedi, Khaleej Times and Dawn News editor
Sara Zahedi (born 1981), Swedish mathematician and refugee from Iran
Shahab Zahedi, first Iranian footballer in Iceland
The descendants of Sheikh Zahed Gilani (1216–1301)
Zahidi (date), a cultivar of the date palm (Phoenix dactylifera)

See also
Zahediyeh, the Sufi Order founded by Zahed Gilani